A subcamp is part of a larger camp or complex, often but not always related to detention:

 A Subcamp (SS) under Nazi Germany was part of an internment or concentration camp, often geographically dispersed; notable examples include:
List of subcamps of Auschwitz
List of subcamps of Buchenwald
List of subcamps of Flossenbürg
List of subcamps of Gross-Rosen 
List of subcamps of Mauthausen 
List of subcamps of Neuengamme
Freiberg subcamp
Fürstengrube subcamp
Mühldorf subcamp
Steyr-Münichholz subcamp
 Within the borders of Guantanamo Bay detention camp, it refers to:
Camp Delta (Guantanamo Bay)
Camp Echo (Guantanamo Bay)
Camp Iguana (Guantanamo Bay)
Camp X-Ray (Guantanamo)
 Within Scouting, it refers to part of a Jamboree (Scouting), organized by region or other theme